Walter George Pitman  (May 18, 1929 – June 12, 2018) was an educator and politician in Ontario, Canada.

Background
Born in Toronto, Ontario, he received a Bachelor of Arts in 1952 and a Master of Arts in 1954 from the University of Toronto. He died in 2018 at the age of 89.

Politics
His victory in a federal by-election held in Peterborough, Ontario on October 31, 1960, as a candidate for the New Party was a significant catalyst in the movement to refound the social democratic Cooperative Commonwealth Federation as the "New Democratic Party" (NDP).

Pitman was a high school teacher when he was nominated by Peterborough's New Party Club to be their candidate in a 1960 by-election. The by-election was called at a time when the CCF, which had been almost wiped out in the 1958 federal election, was in the process of creating, with the Canadian Labour Congress, a new social democratic political party. The call for a yet unnamed "new party" led to the creation of New Party Clubs across the country. The by-election in Peterborough became a test for the arguments of New Party advocates that a political party with the support of organized labour would lead to breakthroughs for the left in Canada.

The CCF had never won election in Peterborough. As a New Party candidate, however, Pitman won over 13,000 votes, beating his nearest opponent by nearly 3,000 votes. Pitman not only won a seat in the House of Commons of Canada but his electoral performance dwarfed the 1,800 votes the CCF had received in the riding in the 1957 and 1958 elections.

Pitman's victory energized the New Party movement, and, in 1961, the CCF and CLC formed a new political entity, the New Democratic Party.

Despite Pitman's new found political celebrity he narrowly lost his seat in the 1962 election by 564 votes. He was defeated again in the 1963 election by 804 votes.

In the 1967 Ontario provincial election, Pitman won the Peterborough seat for the Ontario New Democratic Party. As a Member of Provincial Parliament (MPP), Pitman unsuccessfully ran to replace Donald C. MacDonald as leader of the provincial NDP. He came in second to Stephen Lewis at the 1970 Ontario NDP leadership convention. He lost his seat in the 1971 provincial election.

Later life
Following his electoral defeat, Pitman returned to education as director of the Ontario Institute for Studies in Education, and later president of Ryerson Polytechnical Institute in Toronto. Between his federal and provincial political careers, he was dean of arts and science at Trent University. Robert Gardner wrote of Pitman's leadership years at Ryerson University, "He was universally admired by his colleagues. His approach to education and administration was humane, inclusive, and generous. Many of us who worked closely with him attempted to emulate his remarkable example. That was his most enduring legacy."

Pitman is also a former president of the Canadian Civil Liberties Association.

In 1992, he was made an Officer of the Order of Canada. He was also awarded the Order of Ontario.

Bibliography

References

External links
 Walter Pitman's archives are held at the Clara Thomas Archives and Special Collections, York University Libraries, Toronto, Ontario
 
 
 

1929 births
2018 deaths
Canadian socialists
Canadian university and college chief executives
Members of the House of Commons of Canada from Ontario
Members of the Order of Ontario
Members of the United Church of Canada
New Democratic Party MPs
Officers of the Order of Canada
Ontario New Democratic Party MPPs
Politicians from Toronto
Presidents of Toronto Metropolitan University
Academic staff of Trent University
University of Toronto alumni